Kanirajanu Tissa was King of Anuradhapura in the 1st century, whose short reign lasted from 30 to 33. He succeeded his brother Amandagamani Abhaya as King of Anuradhapura and was succeeded by his nephew Chulabhaya. Mahavamsa mentions King Kanirajanu Tissa as an evil king who killed his brother King Amandagamini and ascended the throne. 

The Mahavamsa states that this king made a court judgment in the Poya house of the Chethiya Giri Vihara and conspired to kill sixty monks who opposed it, prosecuted them and sentenced them to death by throwing them into a precipice filled with iron spikes called 'kanira'.

It is said that during the reign of this wicked ruler, life of the people in the kingdom itself was deplorable.

See also
 List of Sri Lankan monarchs
 History of Sri Lanka

References

External links
 Kings & Rulers of Sri Lanka
 Codrington's Short History of Ceylon

K
K
 Sinhalese Buddhist monarchs
K
K